In mathematics, the Cauchy condensation test, named after Augustin-Louis Cauchy, is a standard convergence test for infinite series. For a non-increasing sequence  of non-negative real numbers, the series  converges if and only if the "condensed" series  converges. Moreover, if they converge, the sum of the condensed series is no more than twice as large as the sum of the original.

Estimate 

The Cauchy condensation test follows from the stronger estimate,

which should be understood as an inequality of extended real numbers. The essential thrust of a proof follows, patterned after Oresme's proof of the divergence of the harmonic series.

To see the first inequality, the terms of the original series are rebracketed into runs whose lengths are powers of two, and then each run is bounded above by replacing each term by the largest term in that run. That term is always the first one, since by assumption the terms are non-increasing.

Integral comparison 

The "condensation" transformation  recalls the integral variable substitution  yielding .

Pursuing this idea, the integral test for convergence gives us, in the case of monotone , that  converges if and only if  converges. The substitution  yields the integral . We then notice that , where the right hand side comes from applying the integral test to the condensed series . Therefore,  converges if and only if  converges.

Examples 

For the most basic example of this sort, the harmonic series  is transformed into the series , which clearly diverges.

As a more complex example, take

When , the condensation transformation gives the series

The logarithms "shift to the left". When  the value of  enters.

Here  denotes the th iterate of a function , so that 
The lower limit of the sum, was chosen so that all terms of the series are positive. Notably, these series provide examples of infinite sums that converge or diverge arbitrarily slowly.

Schlömilch's generalization 
A generalization of the condensation test was given by Oskar Schlomilch. Let  be a strictly increasing sequence of positive integers such that the ratio of successive differences is bounded: there is a positive real number , for which

Then, provided that  meets the same preconditions as in Cauchy's convergence test, the convergence of the series  is equivalent to the convergence of

Taking  so that , the Cauchy condensation test emerges as a special case.

References 

 Bonar, Khoury (2006). Real Infinite Series. Mathematical Association of America. .

External links 
 Cauchy condensation test proof

Augustin-Louis Cauchy
Convergence tests